Melvin Ohio Adams (November 7, 1850 – August 9, 1920) was an American attorney and railroad executive who was part of Lizzie Borden's legal defense team, the United States Attorney for the District of Massachusetts from 1905 to 1906, and the president of the Boston, Revere Beach and Lynn Railroad.

Early life
Adams was born in  Ashburnham, Massachusetts on November 7, 1850, to Joseph Adams and Dolly Winship (Whitney) Adams. He attended school in his native Ashburnham, Massachusetts as well as the Appleton Academy in New Ipswich, New Hampshire. In 1871, he graduated from Dartmouth College. After graduation worked as a teacher in Fitchburg, Massachusetts, and studied law in the office of Amasa Norcross. On January 20, 1874, he married Mary Colony of Fitchburg. From 1874 to 1876, he served as Ashburnham's Town Moderator.

Legal and military career
In 1875, Adams graduated from the Boston University School of Law. He was admitted to the bar that year and was soon thereafter became an assistant district attorney for Suffolk County, Massachusetts. In 1886, Adams resigned his position to go into private practice with Augustus Russ. Adams and Russ remained partners until Russ' death in the summer of 1892.

In 1892, Adams was retained by Andrew V. Jennings to serve as the associate defense counsel for
Lizzie Borden, a Fall River, Massachusetts woman accused of killing her father and stepmother with a hatchet. After a much-publicized trial, Borden was acquitted on June 20, 1893.

An active member of the Massachusetts Republican Party, Adams served on the staff of Governor John Q. A. Brackett as assistant adjutant general with the rank of colonel.

In 1905, Adams was appointed by President Theodore Roosevelt to serve as the United States Attorney for the District of Massachusetts. He remained a U.S. Attorney until his resignation on December 5, 1906.

Business career
In 1890, Adams joined the Boston, Revere Beach and Lynn Railroad as a director and general counsel. From 1891 until his death in 1920 he was the railroad's President.

Adams was also the vice-president of the Liberty Trust Company.

Trustee
Adams served on the Board of Trustees of Dartmouth College and the Perkins School for the Blind. He was instrumental in securing the funds necessary to rebuild Dartmouth Hall.

Death
Adams died on August 9, 1920, at his home in Boston. He was buried in the Meetinghouse Hill Cemetery in Ashburnham.

See also
List of railroad executives

References

1850 births
1920 deaths
American railroad executives
Massachusetts Republicans
People from Ashburnham, Massachusetts
Lawyers from Boston
Dartmouth College alumni
Boston University School of Law alumni
United States Attorneys for the District of Massachusetts
19th-century American lawyers